The C. Henry Kimball House is an historic house at 295 Washington Avenue in Chelsea, Massachusetts. The -story wood-frame house was built c. 1896, and is one of the city's finest Queen Anne Victorian houses. It was built by Charles Henry Kimball, an innovative businessman who developed heated vehicles, revolutionizing the transport of potatoes. He was also a major figure in the development of Chelsea's wholesale fruit and produce exchange.

The house was listed on the National Register of Historic Places in 1982.

See also
National Register of Historic Places listings in Suffolk County, Massachusetts

References

Houses completed in 1888
Houses in Suffolk County, Massachusetts
Houses on the National Register of Historic Places in Suffolk County, Massachusetts
Queen Anne architecture in Massachusetts